Copperstone University is located in Luanshya District, Copperbelt Province, Zambia (25 km north of Luanshya). It is on the Ndola-Kitwe Dual Carriageway (T3 Road). It was founded in 2004.

History
The university was established in 2004, through company incorporation. In July 2011, it attained its charter.

Location
With the main campus located in the northern part of Luanshya District, on the Ndola-Kitwe Dual Carriageway, the university has four campuses. CU operates a branch in Kasama, Northern Province; located at Gateway campus at Sichivula Building.

References

External links 
 

Universities in Zambia
Luanshya
Buildings and structures in Copperbelt Province
Educational institutions established in 2004
2004 establishments in Zambia